The following is an alphabetical list of members of the United States House of Representatives from the state of South Dakota.  For chronological tables of members of both houses of the United States Congress from the state (through the present day), see United States congressional delegations from South Dakota.  The list of names should be complete (as of January 3, 2019), but other data may be incomplete. It includes members who have represented only the state both past and present, as the Dakota Territory encompassed in addition North Dakota, and parts of present-day Wyoming, Montana, and Idaho.

Current member 
 : Dusty Johnson (R) (since 2019)

List of members

See also

List of United States senators from South Dakota
United States congressional delegations from South Dakota
South Dakota's congressional districts

References

South Dakota
 
United States representatives
United States rep